Vladimir Vujović may refer to:
Michel Auclair (b. Vladimir Vujović 1922–1988) Serbian-French actor
Vladimir Vujović (footballer, born 1982) Montenegrin footballer
Vladimir Vujović (footballer, born 1985) Serbian footballer

See also
Vujović